Helge Forsberg (13 November 1920 – 3 January 2005) was a Finnish rower. He competed in the men's coxed four event at the 1948 Summer Olympics.

References

1920 births
2005 deaths
Finnish male rowers
Olympic rowers of Finland
Rowers at the 1948 Summer Olympics
Place of birth missing